Moritz Benedikt Oeler (born 21 October 1985 in Neustadt an der Weinstraße) is a German male former water polo player. He was part of the Germany men's national water polo team in the 2008 Summer Olympics. He also competed at the 2011 World Aquatics Championships.

See also
 Germany men's Olympic water polo team records and statistics

References

External links
 

1985 births
Living people
German male water polo players
Place of birth missing (living people)
Olympic water polo players of Germany
Water polo players at the 2008 Summer Olympics
People from Neustadt an der Weinstraße
Sportspeople from Rhineland-Palatinate